Andrew Roger Melville (born 29 November 1968 in Swansea) is a former Wales international footballer. In the early years of his career, he played in midfield. He was later converted into a central defender.

He started his career at Swansea City before earning a move to Oxford United in July 1990 for £275,000. He later went on to play for Sunderland, Bradford City F.C. and Fulham, before finishing his career with short spells at West Ham United and Nottingham Forest.

He won 65 caps for the Welsh national team between 1989 and 2004, scoring three times.

Andy Melville coaches the Oxford Brookes University football club first team and joined Oxford United as a first-team coach on a short-term contract in July 2009.

Honours
Fulham
UEFA Intertoto Cup: 2002

International goals

References

External links

1968 births
Living people
Footballers from Swansea
Welsh footballers
Wales international footballers
Swansea City A.F.C. players
Oxford United F.C. players
Sunderland A.F.C. players
Fulham F.C. players
Nottingham Forest F.C. players
Bradford City A.F.C. players
West Ham United F.C. players
Premier League players
English Football League players
Association football central defenders
Oxford United F.C. non-playing staff